Maurizio Bellet (born 18 November 1952) is an Italian former professional racing cyclist. He rode in the 1976 Tour de France and 1979 Tour de France.

References

External links
 

1952 births
Living people
Italian male cyclists
Sportspeople from Liège
Cyclists from Liège Province